Sonchus is a genus of flowering plants in the tribe Cichorieae within the family Asteraceae and are commonly known as sow thistles (less commonly hare thistles or hare lettuces). Sowthistles are annual, biennial or perennial herbs, with or without rhizomes and a few are even woody (subgenus Dendrosonchus, restricted to the Canary Islands and Madeira).

Description

The genus is named after the Ancient Greek for such plants.  All are characterized by soft, somewhat irregularly lobed leaves that clasp the stem and, at least initially, form a basal rosette.  The stem contains a milky latex.  Flower heads are yellow and range in size from half to one inch in diameter; the florets are all of ray type. Sonchus fruits are single-seeded, dry and indehiscent. Sow thistles are common roadside plants, and while native to Eurasia and tropical Africa, they are found almost worldwide in temperate regions.

Mature sow thistle stems can range from 30 cm to 2 m (1 to 6 ft) tall, depending upon species and growing conditions.  Coloration ranges from green to purple in older plants.  Sow thistles exude a milky latex when any part of the plant is cut or damaged, and it is from this fact that the plants obtained the common name, "sow thistle", as they were fed to lactating sows in the belief that milk production would increase. Sow thistles are known as "milk thistles" in some regions, although milk thistle more commonly refers to the genus Silybum.

Species
The following 106 species are accepted by Plants of the World Online :

 Sonchus acaulis 
 Sonchus x aemulus 
 Sonchus afromontanus 
 Sonchus araraticus 
 Sonchus arboreus 
 Sonchus arvensis 
 Sonchus asper 
 Sonchus x beltraniae 
 Sonchus berteroanus 
 Sonchus bipontini 
 Sonchus bornmuelleri 
 Sonchus bourgeaui 
 Sonchus brachylobus 
 Sonchus brachyotus 
 Sonchus brassicifolius 
 Sonchus briquetianus 
 Sonchus bupleuroides 
 Sonchus camporum 
 Sonchus canariensis 
 Sonchus capillaris 
 Sonchus cavanillesii 
 Sonchus congestus 
 Sonchus crassifolius 
 Sonchus daltonii 
 Sonchus dregeanus 
 Sonchus erzincanicus 
 Sonchus esperanzae 
 Sonchus fauces-orci 
 Sonchus fragilis 
 Sonchus friesii 
 Sonchus fruticosus 
 Sonchus gandogeri 
 Sonchus gigas 
 Sonchus gomeraensis 
 Sonchus grandifolius 
 Sonchus gummifer 
 Sonchus heterophyllus 
 Sonchus hierrensis 
 Sonchus hotha 
 Sonchus hydrophilus 
 Sonchus integrifolius 
 Sonchus jacottetianus 
 Sonchus jainii 
 Sonchus x jaquiniocephalus 
 Sonchus kirkii 
 Sonchus laceratus 
 Sonchus latifolius 
 Sonchus leptocephalus 
 Sonchus lidii 
 Sonchus lobatiflorus 
 Sonchus luxurians 
 Sonchus macrocarpus 
 Sonchus maculigerus 
 Sonchus malayanus 
 Sonchus marginatus 
 Sonchus maritimus 
 Sonchus masguindalii 
 Sonchus mauritanicus 
 Sonchus x maynari 
 Sonchus megalocarpus 
 Sonchus melanolepis 
 Sonchus micranthus 
 Sonchus microcarpus 
 Sonchus microcephalus 
 Sonchus nanus 
 Sonchus neriifolius 
 Sonchus novae-zelandiae 
 Sonchus x novocastellanus 
 Sonchus obtusilobus 
 Sonchus oleraceus 
 Sonchus ortunoi 
 Sonchus palmensis 
 Sonchus palustris 
 Sonchus parathalassius 
 Sonchus pendulus 
 Sonchus phoeniciformis 
 Sonchus pinnatifidus 
 Sonchus pinnatus 
 Sonchus pitardii 
 Sonchus platylepis 
 Sonchus x prudhommei 
 Sonchus pruinatus 
 Sonchus pustulatus 
 Sonchus radicatus 
 Sonchus regis-jubae 
 Sonchus regius 
 Sonchus x rokosensis 
 Sonchus x rotundilobus 
 Sonchus x rupicola 
 Sonchus saudensis 
 Sonchus schweinfurthii 
 Sonchus sinuatus 
 Sonchus sosnowskyi 
 Sonchus splendens 
 Sonchus stenophyllus 
 Sonchus suberosus 
 Sonchus sventenii 
 Sonchus tectifolius 
 Sonchus tenerrimus 
 Sonchus transcaspicus 
 Sonchus tuberifer 
 Sonchus ustulatus 
 Sonchus webbii 
 Sonchus wightianus 
 Sonchus wildpretii 
 Sonchus wilmsii

Invasive

In many areas sow thistles are considered noxious weeds, as they grow quickly in a wide range of conditions and their wind-borne seeds allow them to spread rapidly.  Sonchus arvensis, the perennial sow thistle, is considered the most economically detrimental, as it can crowd commercial crops, is a heavy consumer of nitrogen in soils, may deplete soil water of land left to fallow, and can regrow and sprout additional plants from its creeping roots. However, sow thistles are easily uprooted by hand, and their soft stems present little resistance to slashing or mowing.

Most livestock will readily devour sow thistle in preference to grass, and this lettuce-relative is edible and nutritious to humans—in fact this is the meaning of the second part of the Latin name of the common sow thistle, oleraceus. Attempts at weed control by herbicidal use, to the neglect of other methods, may have led to a proliferation of these species in some environments.

Cultivation
Sow thistles are common host plants for aphids.  Gardeners may consider this a benefit or a curse; aphids may spread from sow thistle to other plants, but alternatively the sow thistle can encourage the growth of beneficial predators such as hoverflies.  In this regard sow thistles make excellent sacrificial plants. Sonchus species are used as food plants by the larvae of some Lepidoptera including Celypha rufana and the broad-barred white, grey chi, nutmeg, and shark moths . The fly Tephritis formosa is known to attack the capitula of this plant.

Sow thistles have been used as fodder, particularly for rabbits, hence the other common names of "hare thistle" or "hare lettuce".  They are also edible to humans as a leaf vegetable; old leaves and stalks can be bitter but young leaves have a flavour similar to lettuce.   Going by the name puha or rareke (raraki) it is a traditional food eaten in New Zealand by Māori.  When cooked the flavour is reminiscent of chard

Uses
The greens were eaten by the indigenous people of North America. Edible raw when young, the older greens can also be eaten after cooking briefly.

References

External links

  
 Low, Tim. Wild Herbs of Australia and New Zealand. Rev. ed. Angus and Robertson, 1991.  .
 Washington State Noxious Weed Control Board
 Perennial Sowthistle Fact-Sheet
 Botanical.com — sow-thistles
 Tamar Valley Weed Strategy SOW and PRICKLY SOW THISTLES

 
Asteraceae genera
Herbs
Leaf vegetables
New Zealand cuisine
Taxa named by Carl Linnaeus
Māori cuisine